Arra is a census town in the Kanksa CD block in the Durgapur subdivision of the Paschim Bardhaman district in the Indian state of West Bengal.

Geography

Location

Arra, Bamunara, Gopalpur and Amlajora form a cluster of census towns in the western portion of Kanksa CD block.

Urbanisation
According to the 2011 census, 79.22% of the population of the Durgapur subdivision was urban and 20.78% was rural. The sole municipal corporation in Durgapur subdivision is located at Durgapur and the subdivision has 38 (+1 partly) census towns (partly presented in the map alongside; all places marked on the map are linked in the full-screen map).

Demographics
According to the 2011 Census of India, Arra had a total population of 7,808 of which 3,953 (51%) were males and 3,855 (49%) were females. Population in the age range 0–6 years was 791. The total number of literates in Arra was 5,982 (85.25% of the population over 6 years).

In the 2011 census, Durgapur Urban Agglomeration had a population of 581,409 out of which 301,700 were males and 279,709 were females. The 0–6 years population was 51,930. Effective literacy rate for the 7+ population was 87.70. Durgapur Urban Agglomeration included Durgapur (M. Corp), Bamunara and Arra.

Infrastructure

According to the District Census Handbook 2011, Bardhaman, Arra covered an area of 3.7312 km2. Among the civic amenities, it had 10 km roads with open drain, the protected water-supply involved overhead tank, tap water from treated sources, hand pump. It had 1,210 domestic electric connections. Among the medical facilities it had 9 dispensary/ health centres, 3 family welfare centre, 1 maternity and child welfare centre, 1 maternity home, 4 medicine shops. Among the educational facilities it had were 1 primary school, other school facilities were at Gopalpur 3 km away. It had 1 non-formal education centre (Sarva Shiksha Abhiyan).

Culture
Rarheswar Shiva temple has a unique architectural style. It was reportedly built to protect the village from the attack of Bhaskar Pandit, who was a worshipper of Shiva. The old Shiva temple is of the "rekh deul" category. There also is a suggestion that there possibly was an ancient city at this place.

David J. McCutchion mentions that in the reconstructed Rahreswara Shiva temple at Ara. It has a "pirha" style architecture, similar to the mediaeval Odishan model with the tower taking on a high pointed appearance.

References

External links

Cities and towns in Paschim Bardhaman district